Bierna may refer to the following places in Poland:
Bierna, Lower Silesian Voivodeship (south-west Poland)
Bierna, Silesian Voivodeship (south Poland)